Nnewichi is a town in Nnewi North, Anambra State, Nigeria. Nnewichi is the fourth of four quarters in Nnewi town. Others quarters are Otolo, Uruagu and Umudim .

References

Populated places in Anambra State
Nnewi